Mustard Plug is an American ska punk band from Grand Rapids, Michigan, consisting of Dave Kirchgessner (vocals), Brandon Jenison (trumpet), Jim Hofer (trombone), Nate Cohn (drums), Colin Clive (guitar/vocals), Mark Petz (tenor saxophone) and Greg Witulski (bass).

Formed in 1991, the band has regularly toured throughout the United States, Europe, Japan, and South America. They have toured with the Warped Tour twice, and participated in the Ska Against Racism Tour.  , the band has released seven studio albums and continues to tour actively.

Explaining the band's goal, Jim Hofer said, "We may have some messages in our music, but essentially we just do this because we love it and we want people to lighten up and have fun."

History
The band formed in 1991 after Colin and Dave both attended a Special Beat show. The band's original members were Dave Kirchgessner, Mike McKendrick, Colin Clive, and Anthony Vilchez. There was virtually no ska scene in Grand Rapids at the time, so Mustard Plug was able to develop a unique sound and draw a large following.

Brandon Jenison stated in an interview that their band name originated when "a guy in the early stages of the band was making a sandwich and that crusty stuff that forms on the mustard bottle when you put it in the fridge without wiping it off first gave him an interesting idea for a name."

In 2002, the band released Yellow #5, and supported the album for years on tour. In 2005, they released the "greatest hits" album Masterpieces: 1991–2002.

Mustard Plug was on the label Hopeless Records for many years, but as of 2010 were free agents.

The band celebrated their 20th anniversary in 2011 with a national tour.

In 2012 the band had an idea for a live album called Mustard Plug:Live!, but canceled in favor of their 2014 album Can't Contain It, the recording of which was funded via Kickstarter. The album features cover art by Jeff Rosenstock of Bomb the Music Industry.

In May 2017 the band performed at Pouzza Fest in Montreal. In 2019, they embarked on a tour of Japan. The band continues to perform around the United States on a regular basis. In 2021, long-time bassist Rick Johnson left the group.

Discography

Albums
Skapocalypse Now! (1992, Dashiki Clout)
Big Daddy Multitude (1993, Asbestos Records)
Evildoers Beware! (1997, Hopeless Records)
Pray for Mojo (1999, Hopeless Records)
Yellow No. 5 (2002, Hopeless Records)
Masterpieces: 1991-2002 (2005, Hopeless Records)
In Black and White (2007, Hopeless Records)
Can't Contain It (2014, No Idea Records)

Music videos
 Summertime (1992)
 Mr. Smiley (1993)
 Beer (song) (1995)
 You (1997)
 Everything Girl (1999)
 Hit Me! Hit Me! (2007)
 Over the Edge (2007)

Lost music videos 
 Send You Back (1998) - This video was seen on MTV only once before disappearing off air.
 7-11 Man (1991) - A rare live performance of this song was seen once before disappearing.
 Mendoza (1996) - Aired once on Vh1. Now considered to be lost.

Line-up
 Dave Kirchgessner - lead vocals (1991–present)
 Colin Clive - guitar, vocals (1991–present)
 Nathan Cohn - drums (2005–present)
 Brandon Jenison - trumpet, backing vocals (1994–present)
 Jim Hofer - trombone (1994–present)
 Mark Petz - tenor saxophone (1993–1998; 2021–present)
 Greg Witulski - bass (2021–present)

Past members
 Rick Johnson - bass (2004–2021)
 Anthony Vilchez - bass (1991–1994)
 Craig DeYoung - bass (1994–2001), alto saxophone (1992–1994)
 Matt Van - bass (2001–2004)
 Mike McKendrick - drums (1991–1993)
 Michael Skowron - trombone (1993-1995), tenor saxophone (1993-1995)
 Nick Varano - drums (1993–1999)
 Brad Rozier - drums (1999–2004)
 John Massel - drums (2004-2005)
 Bob Engelsman - trombone (1992–1994)
 Bleu VanDyke - trombone (1995–1998)
 Kevin Dixon - tenor saxophone (1996–1998)

Timeline

References

"Mustard Plug Interview: Talks about the New Album, Breakfast Cereals, and more!", "The Battle Of The Midwestern Housewives", July 6, 2007. Accessed July 7, 2007
"Interview with Rick Johnson!", "Michigan Ska Blog", December 12, 2008. Accessed September 9, 2009

External links
Official website
[ Mustard Plug's Allmusic entry]
Interview from 2002
Interview from 2005
Interview from 2007 at ReadJunk.com
Mustard Plug collection at the Internet Archive's live music archive

American ska punk musical groups
Third-wave ska groups
Musical groups from Michigan
Musical groups established in 1991
1991 establishments in Michigan
Hopeless Records artists
Musical groups from Grand Rapids, Michigan